"Just Live More" (stylized as JUST LIVE MORE) is a song by Japanese reggae band Shōnan no Kaze under the name , released on December 11, 2013. It serves as the opening theme song for the children's television series Kamen Rider Gaim.

Background
Shōnan no Kaze (or rather Gaim no Kaze) were first announced to be performing the theme song of the new Kamen Rider Series Kamen Rider Gaim at a press conference for the TV show in late July 2013. In an interview at the conference, band member Red Rice felt honored that he would join the ranks of famous artists who have performed the series' theme songs. Shock Eye revealed he had long been a fan of the series as a child, and even in adulthood. Wakadanna spoke of how he liked the motorcycles and as a child wished he had one as well, as the show seems to have instilled a fighting spirit in those who watch it. Han-kun was jokingly critical about the show's fruit motif, but then said that he knew children would love the show.

Three versions of the single were released: a standard CD only version, a CD and DVD dual disc set, and a special edition CD and DVD dual disc set that included a limited edition towel.

Track listing

Chart performance
"Just Live More" debuted and peaked on Billboard Japans Japan Hot 100 at number 8 and the Hot Singles Sales chart at number 5 on December 23, 2013. Its peak performance on the Oricon's Weekly Singles Charts was at number 6, with 14 weeks spent on the charts.

The single was certified gold for 100,000 digital downloads by the RIAJ in April 2014.

References

Japanese-language songs
Japanese television drama theme songs
2013 singles
Avex Group singles
Kamen Rider Gaim
2013 in Japanese music
Songs with lyrics by Shoko Fujibayashi
2013 songs
Songs with music by Shuhei Naruse